Horn Lake is a city in DeSoto County, Mississippi, United States. As of the 2010 U.S. Census, the population of Horn Lake was 26,066, up from 14,099 in 2000.

Geography
Horn Lake is bordered to the north, east, and southeast by the city of Southaven. U.S Route 51 forms a large portion of Horn Lake's eastern border; it leads north  to downtown Memphis, and south  to Hernando, the DeSoto County seat. Interstate 55 passes just east of Horn Lake, with access from Exits 287,289 and 901.

Demographics

2020 census

As of the 2020 United States Census, there were 26,736 people, 9,620 households, and 6,409 families residing in the city.

2010 census
Horn Lake has experienced substantial African-American growth and to a lesser extent Hispanic growth. Census 2010
revealed Horn Lake was now 56.3% non-Hispanic White (down from 83% in 2000), 33% African-American (up from 12% in 2000), 8% Hispanic, 1% Asian, 0.4% Native American, and 2.3% mixed race.

2000 census
As of the census of 2000, there were 14,099 people, 4,934 households, and 3,754 families residing in the city. The city's racial makeup was 83.0% White, 12.3% African American, 0.9% Asian, 0.5% Native American, <0.1% Pacific Islander, 2.2% from other races, and 1.1% from two or more races. Hispanic or Latino people of any race were 4.3% of the population.

There were 4,934 households, out of which 47.3% had children under the age of 18 living with them, 54.1% were married couples living together, 15.9% had a female householder with no husband present, and 23.9% were non-families. 18.1% of all households were made up of individuals, and 4.6% had someone living alone who was 65 years of age or older. The average household size was 2.86 and the average family size was 3.22.

In the city, the population was spread out, with 32.6% under the age of 18, 10.1% from 18 to 24, 36.5% from 25 to 44, 16.1% from 45 to 64, and 4.8% who were 65 years of age or older. The median age was 29 years. For every 100 females, there were 97.7 males. For every 100 females age 18 and over, there were 93.4 males.

The median income for a household in the city was $40,396, and the median income for a family was $43,495. Males had a median income of $32,595 versus $25,045 for females. The per capita income for the city was $17,183. About 6.1% of families and 6.7% of the population were below the poverty line, including 6.6% of those under age 18 and 17.6% of those age 65 or over.

During 2001, Horn Lake annexed several square miles and about 6,000 people to the west of the city's former borders.  But, in 2011, the Mississippi Supreme Court blocked the annexation of the Town of Walls because, as the Court explained, the City of Horn Lake was experiencing economic problems, did not satisfy the requirements for annexation, and therefore did not have a need to expand.

Economy
Horn Lake is the site of a plant owned by Chicago-based Newly Weds Foods, which manufactures food coatings, seasonings, and other ingredients for the food processing and service industries.

The headquarters of the American Contract Bridge League are in Horn Lake, along with a related Hall of Fame, museum, and library.

The "Elvis Ranch", a  ranch owned by Elvis Presley during the last decade of his life, is in Horn Lake.

Education 
Horn Lake is served by the DeSoto County School District.

Notable people 
 Nakobe Dean (b. 2000), professional football player for the Philadelphia Eagles
 TM Garret (b. 1975), author, producer, filmmaker, radio personality, activist
 Big Walter Horton (1921–1981), blues harmonica player
 Brandon Jackson (b. 1985), running back for the Cleveland Browns
 Van H. Manning (1861–1932), second director of the U.S. Bureau of Mines
 Gary North (1942-2022), economist; as of 2007 lived in Horn Lake
 Gary Parrish, sports columnist and television host
 Cody Reed (b. 1993), professional baseball player for the Tampa Bay Rays

References

External links
City of Horn Lake official website

Cities in Mississippi
Cities in DeSoto County, Mississippi
Memphis metropolitan area